Crinitzberg is a municipality in the district of Zwickau, in Saxony, Germany.

Sons and daughters of the community 

 Frank Bretschneider (born 1956 in Obercrinitz), musician and video artist

References 

Zwickau (district)